Victoria Guardia Alvarado  (born in 1939) is a Costa Rican politician and diplomat. She is the present Ambassador of Costa Rica in the FAO in Malta.

She was born in San José, Costa Rica, in 1939. She studied at universities in Mexico and at the Diplomatic School of Spain. She entered the Ministry of External Relations on June 15, 1966.  She has held numerous diplomatic positions, including First Secretary of the Embassy of Costa Rica in Madrid, head of Cabinet of the Minister, assistant director of International Organizations.

She has also been professor of the diplomatic Institute of the Costa Rican Chancellery.

She is married to Manuel Antonio Hernández Gutiérrez, also an Ambassador of Costa Rica.

References

1939 births
Living people
People from San José, Costa Rica
Representatives of Costa Rica to the Food and Agriculture Organization
20th-century Costa Rican women politicians
20th-century Costa Rican politicians
Costa Rican women ambassadors
Ambassadors to Malta